Cloacibacterium normanense is a bacterium originally found in wastewater in Norman, Oklahoma. It is Gram-negative, non-motile, and facultatively anaerobic. Physically, it is a rod-shaped organism with yellow pigmentation.

This organism was discovered using a non-selective medium, as opposed to the traditional selective media often used to isolate microorganisms. In this case, the method involved diluting raw sewage.

References

 
 

Flavobacteria
Bacteria described in 2006
Bacteria genera